Maribel Solis (date of birth unknown) is a former synchronized swimmer from the Dominican Republic. She competed in both the women's solo and the women's duet competitions at the 1984 Summer Olympics.

References 

Living people
Dominican Republic synchronized swimmers
Olympic synchronized swimmers of the Dominican Republic
Synchronized swimmers at the 1984 Summer Olympics
Year of birth missing (living people)